The 2019–20 Cincinnati Bearcats women's basketball team will represent the University of Cincinnati during the 2019–20 NCAA Division I women's basketball season. The season marks the seventh for the Bearcats as members of the American Athletic Conference. The Bearcats, led by second year head coach Michelle Clark-Heard, will play their home games at Fifth Third Arena.

Previous season
Cincinnati finished the previous season 24–11, 12–4 in AAC play to finish in third place. They advanced to the semifinals of the American Athletic women's tournament where they lost to UCF. They received an automatic bid Women's National Invitation Tournament where they defeated Youngstown State, Minnesota, Butler in the first, second and third rounds before losing to TCU in the quarterfinals.

Media
All games will have a video stream on Bearcats TV, ESPN3, or AAC Digital Network

Offseason

Departing players

2019 Recruits

Incoming transfers

Roster

Schedule and results

|-
!colspan=12 style=""| Exhibition

|-
!colspan=12 style=""| Non-conference regular season

|-
!colspan=12 style=""| AAC regular season

|-
!colspan=12 style=""| AAC Women's Tournament

Awards and milestones

See also
 2019–20 Cincinnati Bearcats men's basketball team

References

External links
Official website

Cincinnati
Cincinnati Bearcats women's basketball seasons
2019 in sports in Ohio
2020 in sports in Ohio